Nando Santos is a Spanish singer and teacher born in La Puebla de Cazalla (Seville) in 1977.

From a young age he began composing and acting in hotels and is part of several duos and trios amateurs.

Between 2003 and 2006 he tried his hand at producing several demos recorded in Madrid to Talavera de la Reina by the producer Borja Martın, current vocalist 'Idolos de polvo'.

In 2008 he signed his first professional contract with record label Kronborg Records.

Nando began his recording career in 2009 with his LP DE CORAZÓN and rose to fame through the program GENTE of TVE.

With their first album managed to carve a niche in the music scene even to get into top 40 and performed concerts throughout Spain.

In November 2013 he made his first international concert in Tilff (Belgium).

Has a degree in French philology, and combines music with teaching. He is the composer of the hymn College Vinaròs Jaume I (Castellón), entitled 'Enseñar y aprender' (Teaching and Learning).

Besides music he is dedicated to give talks and lectures at high schools about the music and human values.

Nando is an artist who has worked in many charity projects as Manos Unidas, FADAM (childhood cancer), Mi mano es tu apoyo (GBV), Partnership against AIDS...

He has shared the stage with important artists such as José el francés, Los chunguitos, Las supremas de Móstoles, Vicente Segui, Arévalo, Joan Rovira, Deduende...

In 2014 he releases a new album titled "Va por ti." With this title, Nando honors his mother, who died shortly before the release of the album. During 2014 and 2015 Nando presents this new work in different places in Spain and offers his first international concert In Tilff (Belgium).

After a small break, claiming personal reasons, Nando Santos prepares a new musical project that will see the light in 2017 titled "VersioNANDO". It is a repertoire of versions to which Nando will give them their own personal touch.

Discography

'De corazón' 2009
This album was produced by Javier Losada and Carlos Lopez for Kronborg records label. Javier Losada is considered one of the best producers in Spain. 
He has worked, among others, with artists such as Alejandro Sanz, Ricky Martin, Manuel Carrasco, Alex Ubago, Innocence or Celia Cruz.
'Va por ti' 2014
This album was produced by Nando Santos and Antonio J. Henares for SGAE.

Singles and videoclips
'Completamente enamorados' 2008
'De ti me enamoré' 2009
'Que te vaya bien' 2010
'Mi lema es amarte' 2011
'Ni una más' 2013
'Siete' 2014

References
 40principales 
 antena3tv 
 elreferente 
 diariodecadiz

External links
 officialweb 
 feelnoise 
 listaoficialventas   

1977 births
Living people
21st-century Spanish singers
21st-century Spanish male singers